Joan Maxine Kupchik ( Miller; June 1, 1922 – January 4, 2022), known professionally as Joan Copeland, was an American actress. She was the younger sister of playwright Arthur Miller. She began her career during the mid-1940s, appearing in theatre in New York City, where, shortly thereafter, she would become one of the first members admitted to the newly formed Actors Studio. She moved into television and film during the 1950s while still maintaining an active stage career. She is best known for her performances in the 1977 Broadway revival of Pal Joey and her award-winning performance in the 1981 play The American Clock. She also played a number of prominent roles on various soap operas throughout her career, including Andrea Whiting on Search for Tomorrow and Gwendolyn Lord Abbott on One Life to Live. She voiced Tanana in Brother Bear.

Personal life
Miller was born to a middle-class Jewish family in New York City. Her father, Isidore, was a woman's clothes manufacturer, and her mother, Augusta (née Barnett), was a schoolteacher and a housewife. She was the younger sister of Kermit Miller and playwright Arthur Miller and was briefly sister-in-law to Marilyn Monroe. She was married to George J. Kupchik, an engineer, from 1946 until his death in 1989. She had a son named Eric with him.

Copeland died at her home in Manhattan on January 4, 2022, at the age of 99.

Career

Copeland began her career in the theatre, making her professional debut as Juliet in William Shakespeare's Romeo and Juliet at the Brooklyn Academy of Music in 1945. She made her Broadway debut as Nadine in the original 1948 production of Bessie Breuer's Sundown Beach. Thereafter she maintained an active career in the theatre. Her other Broadway credits include Detective Story (1949), Not for Children (1951), Handful of Fire (1958), Tovarich (1963), Something More! (1964), The Price (1968), Coco (1969), Two By Two (1970), Checking Out (1976), 45 Seconds from Broadway (2002), and Wit & Wisdom (2003), among others.

She worked extensively Off-Broadway in New York City. Her notable credits therein include Desdemona in Othello at the Equity Library Theatre (1946), Betty Shapiro in The Grass is Greener at the Downtown National Theatre (1955), Melanie in Conversation Piece at the Barbizon-Plaza Theatre (1957), Mrs. Erlynne in Delightful Season at the Gramercy Arts Theatre (1960), Leonie Frothingham in End of Summer at the Manhattan Theatre Club (1974), Lillian Hellman in Are You Now or Have You Ever Been at the Promenade Theatre (1978), the title role in Candida at the Roundabout Theatre (1979), Tasha Blumberg in Isn't It Romantic? at the Playwrights Horizons (1983), Mrs. Thompson in Hunting Cockroaches at the Manhattan Theatre Club (1987), Rose Brill in The Rose Quartet at the Circle Repertory Theatre (1991), Aida Gianelli in Over the River and Through the Woods at the John Houseman Theatre (1998), Nelly Fell in The Torch-Bearers at the Greenwich House Theatre (2000), and as part of a rotating cast in Wit & Wisdom at the Arclight Theatre (2003). She won an Obie Award in 1991 for her portrayal of Eva Adler in The American Plan at the Manhattan Theatre Club.

Copeland began working in television in the early 1950s as a guest actress on such shows as Suspense and The Web and on the live telecast of O'Neill's play The Iceman Cometh in 1960. She appeared on numerous soap operas. She portrayed Andrea Whiting (Joanne's daughter, Patti's malevolent former mother in-law) on Search for Tomorrow, twin sisters Maggie and Kay Logan on Love of Life, and roles on The Edge of Night, How to Survive a Marriage, and As the World Turns. She also portrayed Gwendolyn Lord Abbott on One Life to Live from 1978–1979, and later returned to the series to play Selma Hanen in 1995. Between 1993-1997 she portrayed the recurring character of Judge Rebecca Stein on Law & Order. Her other television credits include guest appearances on The Patty Duke Show, Chicago Hope, ER, All in the Family, and Naked City.

Copeland made her first film appearance as Alice Marie in The Goddess (1958). Her film career was sporadic and her appearances have been almost exclusively in prominent secondary roles. Her film credits include Middle of the Night (1959), Roseland (1977), It's My Turn (1980), A Little Sex (1982), Happy New Year (1987), The Laser Man (1988), Her Alibi (1989), Jungle 2 Jungle (1997), The Peacemaker (1997), The Object of My Affection (1998), The Adventures of Sebastian Cole (1998), The Audrey Hepburn Story (2000), The Last Request (2006), and The Private Lives of Pippa Lee (2009). She also voiced Tanana in Disney's Brother Bear (2003).

In December 2014, Copeland was invited, along with Broadway actor-singer Jamie Ross by The Noel Coward Society to lay flowers on the statue of Sir Noël Coward at The Gershwin Theatre in Manhattan to celebrate the 115th anniversary of Coward's birthday.

Copeland was nominated for a Drama Desk Award for the 1976 production of Pal Joey and won a Drama Desk Award in 1981 for The American Clock.

Filmography

References

External links
 
 
 
 
Joan Copeland at the University of Wisconsin's Actors Studio audio collection
Times Square Online - Joan Copeland, talented sister of Arthur Miller has a lot to say at age 89 - interview by Sandi Durell, video by Magda Katz, posted August 20, 2011

1922 births
2022 deaths
21st-century American Jews
21st-century American actresses
Actresses from New York City
American film actresses
American people of Polish-Jewish descent
American stage actresses
American television actresses
Drama Desk Award winners
Jewish American actresses
Obie Award recipients
20th-century American Jews
20th-century American actresses
Abraham Lincoln High School (Brooklyn) alumni